Francisco Xavier Pacheco (Mickky) is an Indian politician from Goa. He is a former three-term member of the Goa Legislative Assembly of the Nuvem and Benaulim constituencies and former leader of the Indian National Congress. He held portfolios of Rural Development, Archeology and Archives, Tourism, Captain of Ports, Housing, Agriculture, Animal Husbandry, and Sports and Youth Affairs in the state cabinet. 

In 2015, Pacheco was convicted of assaulting a government official and sentenced to imprisonment for six months, forcing him to resign from his ministerial post.

Political career

Pacheco won the 2002 Legislative Assembly election as a member of the United Goans Democratic Party. He later split and formed the United Goans Democratic Party (Secular), which merged with the Bharatiya Janata Party in January 2005. He later joined the Nationalist Congress Party (NCP) and won the 2007 election. Prior to the 2012 Legislative Assembly election, he left the NCP and joined the Goa Vikas Party (GVP). Pacheco's wife Viola Pacheco was made the GVP president in 2012 he quit Goa Vikas Party and joined the Goa Su-raj Party; he lost the Nuvem Constituency in the hands of sitting ZP Member of Nuvem Wilfred D'sa.

In 1981, while he was in seventh standard, Pacheco dropped out of school and became a tailor "to support his family". As per his affidavit in the 2012 Legislative Assembly election, he has assets worth . He was an associate of former Chief Minister of Goa Churchill Alemao, but defeated him in the 2002 election. Several criminal cases are registered against Pacheco; he was also alleged by the United States (US) authorities of his involvement in illegal immigration of Goan youth to the US and money laundering racket.

Personal life
Belonging to a Catholic family, Pacheco claims to be from a "very poor family". He dropped out of school in 1981 when he was in seventh standard, and became a tailor "to support his family". Later he moved to Bahrain and the US. Pacheco says that he is still a fashion designer, and owns a showroom in Paris. Pacheco is a fan of Tupac Shakur and Snoop Dogg, and was a bass guitarist in a local band. Pacheco was the owner of a football club Fransa-Pax FC, which was dissolved in March 2006 as a protest against the All India Football Federation.

Controversies
Pacheco has been involved in various controversies, and has ten criminal cases registered against him. In June 2006, Pacheco slapped a junior engineer Kapil Natekar for not attending his personal assistant's call. Pacheco was sentenced to imprisonment for six months. In June 2010, he was arrested over his alleged involvement in the suicide of his girlfriend Nadia Torrado. He was forced to resign from his ministerial post in the then Indian National Congress-led government, but was later given a clean chit due to absence of evidence. His estranged wife Sara Pacheco accused him of bigamy under the Protection of Women from Domestic Violence Act, 2005.

Pacheco was probed by the Central Bureau of Investigation when the United States' Bureau of Diplomatic Security alleged his involvement in illegal immigration of Goan youth and a money laundering racket.

References

Living people
People from Benaulim
Indian politicians convicted of crimes
Nationalist Congress Party politicians from Goa
Bharatiya Janata Party politicians from Goa
Corruption in Goa
Year of birth missing (living people)
Goa Vikas Party politicians
Goa MLAs 2002–2007
Goa MLAs 2007–2012
Goa MLAs 2012–2017